Swampoodle can refer to:
 Swampoodle, Baltimore, a long-forgotten name for a Czech-American enclave in East Baltimore.
 Swampoodle Connection, a proposed connection of the Chestnut Hill West Line (R8) with the Manayunk/Norristown Line in the Swampoodle neighborhood in Philadelphia.
 Swampoodle Grounds also known as Capitol Park (II), the former home of the Washington Nationals baseball team of the National League from 1886 to 1889 named after the Swampoodle neighborhood.
 Swampoodle (Philadelphia), a former Irish neighborhood and location of the Connie Mack Stadium, also known as Shibe Park. Former home of the Philadelphia Athletics and the Philadelphia Phillies.
 Swampoodle, Washington, D.C., an Irish neighborhood in Washington, D.C.